Asif Ali Khan is a Pakistani film actor who worked in Urdu, Pashto, and Punjabi movies from the 1970s to 2010s. His notable movies include Darra Khaibar (1971), Sargent (1977),  Shola (1978), Parakh (1978), and Shaani (1989). He won 2 Nigar Awards during his 50 years long career.

Life and career
Khan was born in Badrashi village, Nowshera District, Khyber Pakhtunkhwa, in 1947. 

Khan's debut movie was a Pashto film Darra Khaibar, released in 1971. The film was an overnight success, making Asif Khan a household name. His first Urdu film was Suhaag (1972). He has worked in about 450 movies in Urdu, Pashto or Punjabi languages. He has played diverse roles both as a hero and a villain. In 1981, he produced an Urdu film Kala Dhanda Goray Log that did well at the box office.

Personal life
Khan was married in 1966. Of his six children, only Arbaaz Khan chose to adopt the same profession as his father.

Selected filmography
Khan worked in 450 films including 291 Pushto, 87 Urdu, 62 Punjabi:

1971	Darra Khaibar (Pashto)
1971	Ajab Khan Afridae (Pashto)
1972	Meh Jabeenay (Pashto)
1972	Suhag (Urdu)
1973	Kubra Ashiq (Urdu)
1973	Orbal (Pashto)
1973	Nadiya Kay Paar (Urdu)
1974	Khana Badosh (Pashto)
1975	Zartaja (Pashto)
1975	Da Arman (Pashto)
1976	Rastay Ka Pathar (Urdu)
1976	2 Aansoo (Urdu)
1976	Meri Dushmani (Urdu/Pashto double version)
1976	Jagga Gujjar (Punjabi)
1976	Da Inteqam Lumbay (Pashto)
1976	Da Meeney Awar (Pashto)
1976	Inteqam Kay Sholay (Urdu)
1976	Phool Aur Sholay (Urdu)
1977	Aamna Samna (Urdu)
1977	Jasoos (Urdu)
1977	Cheekh (Double version Urdu/Pashto)
1977	Sargent (Urdu)
1977	Yadon Ki Barat (Urdu)
1977	Kon Sharif Kon Badmash (Punjabi)
1977	Baghi Tay Qanoon (Punjabi)
1977	Teesri Qasm (Urdu)
1978	Parakh (Urdu)
1978	Takrao (Urdu)
1978	Inqilab (Urdu)
1978	Ghazi Ilmuddin Shaheed (Punjabi)
1978	Khan Dost (Punjabi)
1978	 Shola (Urdu)
1978	Qayamat (Urdu)
1979	Yahan Say Wahan Tak (Urdu)
1979	Naqsh-e-Qadam (Urdu)
1979	Aurat Raj (Urdu)
1979	Ghunda Act (Punjabi)
1979	Badnam (Pashto)
1979	Gehray Zakham (Urdu)
1981	Kala Dhanda Goray Log (Urdu)
1981	Sangram (Urdu)
1981	Pakhtun Pa Wilayat Kamb (Pashto)
1982   Jurm-o-Saza (Pashto)
1984   Ukhly Nave (Pashto)
1984   Karaye Kay Goreelay (Urdu)
1988	Gharibon Ka Badshah (Urdu)
1989	Shaani (Urdu)
1989	Kalka (Punjabi)
1989	Madam Bawri (Punjabi/Urdu double version)
 1995  Mushkil (Urdu)
1996	Chief Saab (Urdu)
1998	Dupatta Jall Raha Hay (Urdu)
2005	Kyun Tum Say Itna Pyar Hay (Urdu)
2013	Inteha (Pashto)

Awards

References

1947 births
People from Nowshera District
Pashtun people
Pakistani male film actors
Male actors in Urdu cinema
Male actors in Pashto cinema
Male actors in Punjabi cinema
Living people